Elsewhere is the second live album by American rock band Pinegrove, released January 20, 2017 on Run for Cover. The album follows their breakout record, Cardinal, which was released a year prior and attracted acclaim from music critics. Pinegrove performed nearly 200 shows in the year between, and celebrated their success with Elsewhere. The group also recorded a session for Audiotree Live, which was released on streaming services as a standalone live release preceding the creation of Elsewhere.

The album was released on Bandcamp, utilizing the platform's name-your-price option. All proceeds are donated to the Southern Poverty Law Center. It was also issued on cassette by Run for Cover, which was released in March 2017.

Background
Elsewhere documents Pinegrove's live performances in 2016, a year in which the band performed nearly 200 concerts. Its recordings are culled from the band's tour with Kevin Devine, Petal, and Julien Baker. On its Bandcamp release page, the band's frontman, Evan Stephens Hall, gave insight into the album's creation:

The album was released on January 20, 2017, the day of the Inauguration of Donald Trump. The album's title is derived from a lyric in the song "Visiting": "City to city / Montclair and elsewhere."

Reception
Sam Sodomsky of Pitchfork dubbed the release "lovable," writing, "all of Pinegrove's songs feel bigger, tighter, and more controlled, without losing the edge that made them stand out in the first place. More than anything, Elsewhere is a testament to just how good a live band Pinegrove has become." The New York Times Joe Coscarelli mentioned the album, referring to the band at this period as a "stalwart live act".

Track listing

Personnel
Evan Stephens Hall – vocals, guitar
Nandi Rose Plunkett – vocals, keyboards, percussion
Josh Marre – guitar, vocals
Adan Carlo – bass
Sam Skinner – guitar, mixing, and mastering
Zack Levine – drums, vocals

Production
Megan Benavente – recording engineer on tracks 1, 2, 4, 6, 8
Adam Straus – recording engineer on tracks 3, 5, 7

References

External links

Elsewhere at Bandcamp (streamed copy where licensed)

2017 live albums
Pinegrove (band) albums
Run for Cover Records albums